Fatah Ka Fatwa is an Indian discussion show, hosted by secularist and liberal activist Tarek Fatah on Hindi news channel Zee News. The 17-episode show focuses on issues relevant to Islam, such as terrorism, wearing the Hijab, the concept of a Kafir, Nikah mut‘ah, Nikah Halala, Islamic banking and finance, Child marriage etc. The series tries to explain various facets of the Quran as well as other theological nuggets of Islam. Asian Paints was initially the sponsor of the programme but company had to withdraw its support after an online petition was started calling Indian Muslims to boycott the brand, but later yoga guru Baba Ramdev’s Patanjali Ayurved Ltd. stepped forward to offer the crucial sponsor support to Zee News and became its sponsor. Season 1 of the show ended on 6 May 2017.

Guests

Season 1

 Arif Mohammad Khan
 Zakia Soman
 Naish Hasan
 Shabnam Khan
 Amina Shervani
 Shazia Ilmi
 Sheeba Aslam Fehmi
 Dr. Sheerin Masroor 
 Shabnam Siddiqui
 Lubna Sarwath
 Rahman Abbas
 Capt. Sikander Rizvi
 Zeenat Shaukat Ali 
 H Abdul Raqeeb
 Mohammed Hanif Khan Shastri
 Maulana Ansar Raza
 Amber Zaidi
 Gulrez Sheikh
 Maulana Mohammed Hameed Kausar.
 Maulana Sajid Rashidi

Episodes

Season 1

Reception
The show was well received. The show noticed a huge engagement on social media with the #FatahKaFatwa trending on Twitter. An orthodox radical Maulana Ansar Raza who heads the ‘Gareeb Nawaz Foundation’ NGO filed a PIL against Fatah Ka Fatwa show. In February 2017, Rashtriya Ulama Council complained to ECI to ask Zee News to stop the programme on as it is polarising voters ahead of Uttar Pradesh assembly polls. A Bareilly-based radical Islamic organisation All India Faizan-e-Madina Council asked to halt the show.

Complaints
 Delhi High Court has sent notice to Ministry of Information and Broadcasting (India) and asked a reply on ‘Fatah ka Fatwa’ against the allegation of blasphemy, by  a petition of the Mullahs. They demanded to ban the show; and also asked to remove the content from YouTube.

References

Hindi-language television shows
2017 Indian television series debuts